Jhye Avon Richardson (born 20 September 1996) is an Australian cricketer. He made his debut in domestic cricket in October 2015, and made his international debut for the Australia national cricket team in February 2017.

Domestic and franchise career
Richardson is a right-arm fast bowler, and says that, due to his height (178 cm) and frame ("70 odd kilos"), he was initially discouraged by coaches to become a pace bowler, a role generally associated with taller and weightier cricketers. He made his List A debut for Western Australia on 21 October 2015 in the 2015–16 Matador BBQs One-Day Cup. In December 2015 he was named in Australia's squad for the 2016 Under-19 Cricket World Cup. On 16 January 2016 he made his Twenty20 debut for the Perth Scorchers in the 2015–16 Big Bash League. He made his first-class debut for Western Australia on 15 March 2016 in the 2015–16 Sheffield Shield.

In the 2016–17 Big Bash League Richardson claimed 11 wickets for the Scorchers and was named player of the match in the final after taking 3/30 as the Scorchers defeated the Sydney Sixers.

In November 2018, Richardson took a career best 8/47 in the first innings against New South Wales at Optus Stadium.

In February 2021, Richardson was bought by the Punjab Kings in the IPL auction ahead of the 2021 Indian Premier League, and also the Welsh Fire for the inaugural 2021 season of The Hundred tournament. He was bought by Mumbai Indians in the IPL 2023 auction.

In March 2023, Richardson underwent surgery to address hamstring issues, and will miss the 2023 IPL season as a result.

International career
In February 2017 Richardson was named in Australia's Twenty20 International (T20I) squad for their series against Sri Lanka. He made his Twenty20 International (T20I) debut for Australia against Sri Lanka at Kardinia Park, Geelong on 19 February 2017.

In January 2018, he was named in Australia's One Day International (ODI) squad for their series against England. He made his ODI debut for Australia against England on 19 January 2018. Later in the same month, he was named in Australia's Test squad for their series against South Africa in March 2018, however, he did not play. In April 2018, he was awarded a national contract by Cricket Australia for the 2018–19 season.

In January 2019, Richardson was named in the squad for the ODI series against India. He played the first game at the Sydney Cricket Ground and returned with his career best figures of 4/26, including the wicket of the Indian captain Virat Kohli, to help Australia to its 1,000th international win across all formats. Later the same month, Richardson was added to Australia's Test squad for the series against Sri Lanka, replacing the injured Josh Hazlewood. He made his Test debut for Australia against Sri Lanka on 24 January 2019, taking three wickets in the first innings.

He was awarded the Bradman Young Cricketer of the Year at the Allan Border Medal ceremony by Cricket Australia in 2018.

Richardson played in the final three matches of Australia's ODI series against India in March 2019, claiming 8 wickets as Australia came back from an 0–2 series deficit to eventually win the series 3–2.

In the subsequent series against Pakistan in the UAE in March 2019, Richardson dislocated his shoulder in the second match diving in the outfield. Despite this, in April 2019 he was named in Australia's squad for the 2019 Cricket World Cup. The International Cricket Council (ICC) named him as one of the five exciting talents making their Cricket World Cup debut. However, he was later ruled out of the tournament and was replaced in the squad by Kane Richardson.

In December 2021, in the second Ashes match against England, Richardson took his first five-wicket haul in Test cricket.

References

External links
 

1996 births
Living people
Australia Test cricketers
Australian cricketers
Australia One Day International cricketers
Australia Twenty20 International cricketers
Cricketers at the 2019 Cricket World Cup
Punjab Kings cricketers
Perth Scorchers cricketers
Western Australia cricketers